Patrick Beckert (born 17 April 1990) is a German Olympic speed skater.

Becket finished in 22nd place in the 5000 m at the 2010 Winter Olympics. He missed one race because his mobile phone was turned off. He was the fourth reserve for that race, and neither he nor the German team manager thought he would be selected. The Olympic Games officials attempted to call all four reserves after a skater withdrew just one hour before the race, but none four skaters were reachable.

He has set eleven German records in the senior division, seven German records in the junior division, and eight championship records. He was the first German speed skater to skate the 10000 meter under 13 minutes and the 3000-meter event under 3:40 minutes. At the end of the 2018–2019 season, Beckert was the highest-placed German skater (27th) on the Adelskalender samalog table with 147.980 points.

His mother and five brothers and sisters all did speed skating. One of his sisters, Stephanie, won three medals at the 2010 Games.

Speed skating

Personal records

Tournament overview

Source German data:

 DNQ = Did not qualify for the final distance
 DQ  = Disqualified

World Cup overview

  – = Did not participate
 (b) = Division B
 DQ = Disqualified

Medals won

Extras
Thuringian achiever of the year 2011
Erfurt athlete of the year 2016
Erfurt athlete of the year 2017

References

External links
 

1990 births
German male speed skaters
Speed skaters at the 2010 Winter Olympics
Speed skaters at the 2014 Winter Olympics
Speed skaters at the 2018 Winter Olympics
Speed skaters at the 2022 Winter Olympics
Olympic speed skaters of Germany
Sportspeople from Erfurt
Living people
World Single Distances Speed Skating Championships medalists